The 147th Attack Wing (147 ATKW) is a unit of the Texas Air National Guard, stationed at Ellington Field Joint Reserve Base, Houston, Texas. If activated to federal service, the Wing is gained by the United States Air Force Air Combat Command.

The 111th Attack Squadron, assigned to the Wing's 167th Operations Group, is a descendant organization of the World War I 111th Aero Squadron, established on 14 August 1917. It was reformed on 29 June 1923, as the 111th Observation Squadron, and is one of the 29 original National Guard Observation Squadrons of the United States Army National Guard formed before World War II.

Overview
The 147th Attack Wing, at Ellington Field in Houston, TX, flies combat support missions 24/7 via advanced satellite communications thus providing surveillance, reconnaissance, and air support for US and Allied forces. In conducting combat support sorties, the 147 ATKW provides theater and national-level leadership with critical real-time Intelligence, Surveillance, and Reconnaissance and air-to-ground munitions and strike capability. A colocated Air Support Operations Squadron provides terminal control for weapons employment in a close air support scenario integrating combat air and ground operations.

Units
The 147th Attack Wing consists of the following units:
 147th Operations Group
 111th Attack Squadron
 111th Weather Flight
 147th Operations Support Squadron
 147th Operations Group Detachment One (JBSA-Randolph)
 147th Air Support Operations Squadron
 147th Maintenance Group
 147th Aircraft Maintenance Squadron
 147th Maintenance Operations Flight
 147th Munitions Flight
 147th Mission Support Group
 147th Civil Engineer Squadron
 147th Communications Flight
 147th Force Support Squadron
 147th Logistics Readiness Squadron
 147th Security Forces Squadron
 147th Medical Group

History

In 1957, the Texas Air National Guard 111th Fighter-Interceptor Squadron, stationed at Ellington Air Force Base, near Houston was authorized to expand to a group level under the 136th Air Defense Wing.  On 1 July 1957, the National Guard Bureau extended federal recognition to the 147th Fighter-Interceptor Group.   The 111th FIS was reassigned from the 136th Fighter-Interceptor Group to the 147th FIG, becoming the new group's flying squadron.   Support squadrons of the 147th FIG were the 144th Headquarters, 144th Material Squadron (Maintenance), 144th Combat Support Squadron, and the 144th USAF Dispensary.

Air Defense
Initially equipped with the F-86D Sabre Interceptor, in June 1959 the squadron traded their F-86Ds for the upgraded F-86L Sabre Interceptor with uprated afterburning engines and new electronics.  In August 1960 the unit became one of the first to transition to the F-102A Delta Dagger Mach-2 all-weather interceptor and began a 24-hour alert to guard the Texas Gulf coast.

In August 1961, as part of an Air Defense Command re-organization, the Group's assignment to 136th Air Defense Wing was terminated with 136th being transferred to Tactical Air Command.  The 147th was directly assigned to the Texas Air National Guard, being operationally gained by the Air Defense Command 33d Air Division.

On 1 January 1970, the squadron was re-designated as the 111th Combat Crew Training Squadron and served as the Air National Guard's RTU (Replacement Training Unit) for the TF/F-102A, In 1971, when the active-duty force ceased F-102A training and closed Perrin AFB, Texas on 30 June 1971, the Houston-based 111th FIS became the Replacement Training Unit (RTU) for all Air Defense Command F-102 pilots, and the squadron received several TF-102A dual-seat trainers which were transferred from Perrin AFB while also retaining the T-33A instrument training function.

One pilot who flew TF/F-102As with the 111th was 1st Lt. George W. Bush, a future Governor of Texas and future President of the United States. George W. Bush's military service began in 1968 when he enlisted in the Texas Air National Guard after graduating with a bachelor's degree in history from Yale University. After being accepted into the ANG, Airman Basic Bush was selected to attend pilot training. His six weeks of basic training was completed at Lackland AFB in Texas during July and August 1968. Upon its completion, Bush was promoted to the officer's rank of second lieutenant required for pilot candidates. He spent the next year in flight school at Moody AFB in Georgia from November 1968 to November 1969.  Bush then returned to Ellington AFB in Texas to complete seven months of combat crew training on the F-102 from December 1969 to June 1970. This period included five weeks of training on the T-33 Shooting Star and 16 weeks aboard the TF-102 Delta Dagger two-seat trainer and finally the single-seat F-102A. Bush graduated from the training program in June 1970. Lt. Bush remained in the Texas ANG as a certified F-102 pilot who participated in frequent drills and alerts through April 1972.  Lt. Bush was honorably discharged from the Air National Guard in October 1973 at the rank of First Lieutenant. An ANG physical dated 15 May 1971 indicates that he had logged 625 flight hours by that time, and he ultimately completed 326 hours as pilot and 10 as co-pilot while serving with the 111th Fighter-Interceptor Squadron.

In May 1971, the 111th added F-101B/F Voodoos and became the RTU tar the twin seat F-101F type, while continuing as the F-102 Delta Dagger RTU.  In January 1975, after 14 years of service, the unit's F-102s were retired, but the unit maintained a full fleet of F-101s.

The 111th also operated detachment 1 of the 147th FIW at New Orleans. The detachment was apart from the squadron in that it maintained constant alert status whilst facing towards Cuba.

In October 1979, in as part of the inactivation of Aerospace Defense Command, the USAF gained command responsibilities which shifted to Tactical Air Command (TAC) and a sub-organization equivalent to a numbered air force designated as Air Defense, Tactical Air Command (ADTAC).   In 1982, the F-101s were retired and ADTAC re-equipped the 111th with the McDonnell F-4C Phantom II and continued its air defense mission.  Most of the F-4Cs the squadron received were Vietnam War veteran aircraft.    In November 1986, the F-4Cs were replaced by later-model F-4Ds.

In December 1989 the 111th FIS started receiving block 15 F-16A/B Fighting Falcon aircraft to replace their F-4Ds. The last F-16 arrived in April 1990.

In 1992, only a few years following the acceptance of their block 15s, they converted to the ADF variant of the block 15. On 15 March 1992 the 111th FIS was re-designated the 111th Fighter Squadron when its parent 147th Fighter Group converted to the USAF Objective Organization plan. Also in 1992 the 111th FS celebrated their 75th anniversary. To commemorate this F-16A ADF #82-1001 was painted in special markings including a big Texas flag painted on the fuselage underside.  During September 1995, the 111th FS ended its alert detachment in New Orleans with the F-101 Voodoo, also the 147th was upgraded to a Wing, with the 111th Fighter Squadron being assigned to the new 147th Operations Group.

Tactical Fighter mission
In late 1996 the 111th started to retire their ADF F-16s to AMARC. To replace these aircraft the squadron received the block 25 F-16C/D Fighting Falcon. Transition started in September 1996 and was completed by February 1997. This brought a change in role which officially happened in October 1998. The role went from air-to-air to an air-to-ground mission. After returning from an Operation Southern Watch mission at Prince Sultan Air Base, Saudi Arabia in October 2000, the squadron added Precision Guided Munitions to its arsenal.

Global War on Terrorism

Following the 11 September 2001 terrorist attacks, four 111th Fighter Squadron aircraft were launched to escort President George W. Bush, onboard Air Force 1 from Florida to Louisiana, Nebraska and finally back to Washington DC that same day. December 2001 saw the 111th deploy to Atlantic City, New Jersey, to fly Air Defense Combat Air Patrol missions over New York, Philadelphia and Washington DC in support of Operation Noble Eagle.

In August 2005 components of the 111th Fighter Squadron and 147th Fighter Wing deployed to Balad Airbase, Iraq to conduct combat operations in support of Operation Iraqi Freedom and the Global War on Terrorism. The men and women of the 111th FS/147th FW once again distinguished themselves by flying 462 sorties and almost 1,900 hours in a two-month span; with a perfect record of 100% maintenance delivery (zero missed sorties), 100% mission effectiveness, and 100% weapons employment/hits under the most challenging combat conditions.

In April 2007, components of the 111th Fighter Squadron and 147th Fighter Wing again deployed to Balad Airbase, Iraq for the Iraq War. On this deployment, the 111th Fighter Squadron flew 348 tasked sorties, plus six no-notice Close Air Support (CAS) alert scrambles and four short-notice (less than 30 minutes & not on the Air Tasking Order.) pre-planned alert launches. With an average combat sortie lasting almost 4.42 hours, the unit accumulated a total of 1537.1 combat hours. Maintenance delivery effectiveness for this deployment was an astonishing 102% due to the inclusion of the unscheduled CAS scrambles. Mission effectiveness and weapons employment were both once again a perfect 100%.

BRAC 2005 reorganization
During the 2005 Base Realignment and Closure Commission, it was recommended that the F-16 Block 25s be retired. Texas Governor, Rick Perry, reacted quickly and made sure the unit could remain alive and did so by securing MQ-1 Predator operations. This is an unmanned aircraft and although not exactly what the 111th FS had hoped for, it would keep the unit going well into the future.

As was earlier planned in 2005, the 111th FS gave up its last two F-16s on 7 June 2008 and F-16 operations drew to a close. The MQ-1 replaced the F-16 and the parent wing was renamed the 147th Reconnaissance Wing that same month.

The 111th RS received its first MQ-9 Reaper on 28 July 2017, and the parent wing was renamed 147th Attack Wing shortly thereafter.

Lineage

 Established as the 147th Fighter Group (Air Defense) and allotted to the Air National Guard, 1957
 Extended federal recognition on: 1 July 1957
 Redesignated 147th Fighter Group, 10 March 1992
 Status changed from Group to Wing, 1 October 1995
 Redesignated 147th Fighter Wing, 1 October 1995
 Redesignated 147th Reconnaissance Wing, 1 July 2008
 Redesignated 147th Attack Wing, 2017

Assignments
 136th Air Defense Wing, 1 July 1957
 Texas Air National Guard, 1 September 1961
 Gained by: 33d Air Division, Air Defense Command
 Gained by: Oklahoma City Air Defense Sector, Air Defense Command, 25 June 1963
 Gained by: 31st Air Division, Air Defense Command, 1 April 1966
 Gained by: 31st Air Division, Aerospace Defense Command, 15 January 1968
 Gained by: Fourteenth Air Force, Aerospace Defense Command, 31 December 1969
 Gained by: 20th Air Division, Aerospace Defense Command, 1 July 1973
 Gained by: Air Defense, Tactical Air Command (ADTAC), 1 October 1979
 Gained by: Southeast Air Defense Sector (SEADS), First Air Force, 1 July 1987
 Gained by: Air Combat Command, 1 October 1996–Present

Components
 147th Operations Group, 1 October 1995 – Present
 111th Fighter-Interceptor (later Fighter, Reconnaissance) Squadron, 1 July 1957 – Present

Stations
 Ellington Air Force Base, Houston, Texas, 1 July 1957
 Ellington Air National Guard Base, Houston, Texas, 1 July 1976
 Designated: Ellington Field Joint Reserve Base, Houston, Texas, 1991–Present

Aircraft

 F-86D Sabre Interceptor, 1957–1959
 F-86L Sabre Interceptor, 1959–1960
 TF/F-102A Delta Dagger, 1960–1975
 F-101B/F Voodoo, 1971–1982
 RF-4C Phantom II, 1974

 F-4C Phantom II, 1982–1987
 F-4D Phantom II, 1987–1989
 Block 15 F-16A/B Fighting Falcon, 1989–1996
 Block 25 F-16C/D Fighting Falcon, 1996–2008
 MQ-1B Predator, 2008–2017
 MQ-9 Reaper, 2017–Present

References 

 147th Attack Wing official website

External links 

Wings of the United States Air National Guard
Texas Military Forces
147
Military units and formations established in 2017
Ellington Airport (Texas)